Robert Tomlinson may refer to:

 Robert Tomlinson (missionary) (1842–1913), Irish Anglican medical missionary
 Robert George Tomlinson (1869–1949), English brewer and cricketer
 R. Parkinson Tomlinson (1881–1943), British corn merchant and politician
 Bob Tomlinson, English footballer
 Tommy Tomlinson (Robert M. Tomlinson, born 1945), member of the Pennsylvania State Senate
 Robert Tomlinson (Kansas politician)